Felipe de Souza Macena (born 25 July 1993), or simply Felipe Macena, is a Brazilian defensive midfielder.

Felipe Macena has appeared in Campeonato Brasileiro Série B with América Futebol Clube (RN) and Vila Nova Futebol Clube.

Honours

Remo
Campeonato Paraense: 2015

References

External links 
 Felipe Macena at playmakerstats.com (English version of ogol.com.br)

Living people
1993 births
Brazilian footballers
Association football midfielders
América Futebol Clube (RN) players
Vila Nova Futebol Clube players
Clube do Remo players